Mads Larsen (born 9 February 1973) is a former professional boxer who competed from 1993 to 2012. He held the IBO super middleweight title from 1997 to 1999. He challenged once for the unified WBA (Super) and IBF super middleweight titles in 2003. At regional level, he held the EBU European super middleweight title in 2003.

Professional career
In October 1993, Larsen turned professional winning his first fight in Storebaelthallen, Korsoer, Denmark on the undercard of a bill that included Danish stars Johnny Bredahl, Jimmy Bredahl and Brian Nielsen. In that fight Larsen beat England's Martin Jolley with a knockout in the fourth round.

Title fights
After 18 fights and a record of 17 wins and 1 loss (on cuts), Larsen won his first title belt, the vacant IBO world super middleweight title, in May 1997 with a fourth-round knockout win over American Shannon Landberg.

Larsen went on to win his next 10 straight fights, including three defenses of his IBO title. In his next fight in March 1999, Larsen retained his IBO title and also picked up the WBF title with a win over Thulani "Sugar Boy" Malinga with a tenth-round knockout on home turf at the Falconer Centret, Copenhagen.

Ottke fight
Larsen won his next fifteen fights and remained unbeaten when he signed for his highest profile fight in September 2003 at the Messehalle, Erfurt, Thuringia, in Germany when he challenged fellow unbeaten fighter, the German, Sven Ottke for his WBA and IBF super middleweight titles. However, Larsen suffered the second defeat of his career when Ottke beat Larsen. After a hard-fought fight Larsen lost on points by a majority decision.

Larsen then won a European super middleweight title only one month later, beating German Danilo Haussler on points.

Break from boxing
Following a shoulder injury as well as a promotion dispute, Larsen spent over three years out of the ring and returned in May 2007 after he signed with Sauerland Promotions.
Since his return, Larsen has won all his fights and had an EBU title fight scheduled for January 16, 2010 in Aarhus, Denmark. His opponent was originally planned to be Dimitri Sartison, who lost to Mikkel Kessler in a WBA title bout in June 2008.

Larsen made an unsuccessful comeback bid in January 2010, suffering a TKO to Brian Magee. After the fight, Larsen was accused of doping on the basis of a blood-sample, but was later cleared of all charges by the Danish Boxing Association

Professional boxing record

References

External links
 

Super-middleweight boxers
Living people
1973 births
Sportspeople from Aarhus
International Boxing Organization champions
Danish male boxers